M300 or M-300 may refer to:

 CVT M-300, a glider aircraft
 GM M300 platform, a car platform
 HKL Class M300, a metro train class
 Zotye M300, a Chinese version of the Fiat Multipla